This list of tallest buildings in Wisconsin ranks skyscrapers in the U.S. state of Wisconsin by height. The tallest 16 buildings in Wisconsin are located in Milwaukee. The tallest is the U.S. Bank Center (Milwaukee), followed by Northwestern Mutual Tower and Commons.

Tallest buildings
This list contains buildings in Wisconsin with a height of 280 feet (85) or more. Of the 19 buildings, 18 are located in Milwaukee and 1 in Madison. The following list includes the rank of the building, name of the building, city the building is in, image of the building, height of the building in feet and meters, how many floors the building has, the year the building was made in, and notes.

See also
List of tallest buildings in Madison, Wisconsin
List of tallest buildings in Milwaukee
List of tallest buildings by U.S. state

References

Tallest

Wisconsin